Hinge Studios was initially a premiere recording and mixing facility located in Chicago, Illinois and home to Grammy winning producer/mixer Craig Bauer. Opened by Bauer in 1993, the studio was a pioneer in ushering in the world of digital recording with one of the country’s first Euphonix CSII digitally controlled recording consoles and the very first Otari RADAR 48 track hard disk recording system.

In 2014, Hinge Studios relocated to Los Angeles, California, where the studio was temporarily operating at the historic Devonshire Studios in North Hollywood. Hinge Studios is now permanently located in Los Angeles, California, in a highly acclaimed Northward Acoustics designed room. The studio features an Avid S6 control surface and ATC speakers.

Hinge Studios and Bauer have hosted and recorded a diverse roster of talent over the years, including: Kanye West, Lupe Fiasco, Justin Timberlake, Halo Circus, Justin Young, THE Nghbrs, Anita Wilson, Ed Sheeran, The Clark Sisters, Janet Jackson, Rihanna, Common, Jennifer Hudson, Lil’ Kim, Wu-Tang Clan, Da Brat, Brian Culbertson, Richard Marx, 98°, Yolanda Adams, Steve Cole, Dave Koz, Dennis DeYoung, Styx, Donald Lawrence, Destiny’s Child, Public Enemy, Hezekiah Walker, The Silhouet, and The Smashing Pumpkins.

Hinge Studios Chicago was once dubbed “Kanye West’s fortress of solitude in the late ‘90s” by MTVNews.

In 2012, he mixed Ed Sheeran's live performances at HINGE studios as part of The Warner Sound "The Live Room" series, which has collectively garnered 95 million views on YouTube. The performances included "The A Team", "Give Me Love", "You Don't Need Me, I Don't Need You", "Lego House" and "Be My Husband" (Nina Simone cover).

Awards 
Craig Bauer received a Grammy award at the 50th Annual Grammy Awards for mixing The Clark Sisters’ 2007 album, Live: One Last Time and has been recognized by NARAS and the Grammy‘s for over 30 nominations in various categories and genres. He has been nominated twice for Album of the Year.

References

External links 
 
 The Warren Sound: Ed Sheeran at The Live Room, Hinge Studios

Recording studios in California
North Hollywood, Los Angeles